Zipbangboom is the third album by Fishboy.

Track listing
 Aye Aye Sucka Sucka
 Ray the Mover
 The Contents of Your Pocket
 Carpet Diem (Russell's Dream)
 Onomatopoeia
 Talking to the Doctor after Pressing the Elevator Button that Grew on Your Forehead Overnight, Causing Your Legs to Grow Uncontrollably
 Bathtub (Brushing My Teeth)
 Saving Lincoln
 4-Legged Car
 The Pencil Sharpener
 How Do I Grow
 Giant Ear
 Monopatomia (The End)

2003 albums
Fishboy (band) albums